Vijayalakshmi Ravindranath (born 18 October 1953) is an Indian neuroscientist. She is currently a professor at the Centre for Neuroscience, Indian Institute of Science in Bangalore. She was the founder director of the National Brain Research Centre, Gurgaon (2000-9) and founder chair of the Centre for Neuroscience at Indian Institute of Science. Her main area of interest is the study of brain related disorders including neurodegenerative diseases such as Alzheimer's and Parkinson's. She serves as the founding director of the Centre for Brain Research in Bangalore.

Education and career
Ravindranath earned her B.Sc. and M.Sc. degrees from Andhra University, received her Ph.D. in biochemistry in 1981 from Mysore University, and worked at the National Cancer Institute in the US as a postdoctoral fellow. She joined the National Institute of Mental Health and Neurosciences in Bangalore, where she studied the metabolizing capacity of the human brain, focusing especially on psychoactive drugs and environmental toxins. In 1999, she helped Department of Biotechnology of the Government of India to establish National Brain Research Centre to co-ordinate and network neuroscience research groups in India.

Awards and recognitions
Ravindranath is an elected fellow of several Indian academies: Indian Academy of Sciences, National Academy of Sciences, Indian National Science Academy and National Academy of Medical Sciences, Indian Academy of Neurosciences and Third World Academy of
Sciences.

 Shanti Swarup Bhatnagar Prize for Science and Technology for Medical Sciences in 1996 
 KP Bhargava Medal of Indian National Science Academy 
 Om Prakash Bhasin Award for Science & Technology in 2001
J.C. Bose Fellowship (2006)
 S.S. Bhatnagar Award of Indian National Science Academy (2016)
 Padma Shri Award in 2010

Publications

References

Living people
Indian women biologists
20th-century Indian biologists
Indian neuroscientists
Indian women neuroscientists
1953 births
Recipients of the Padma Shri in science & engineering
Fellows of the National Academy of Medical Sciences
Academic staff of the Indian Institute of Science
Scientists from Chennai
20th-century Indian women scientists
21st-century Indian biologists
Indian women medical researchers
Indian medical researchers
21st-century Indian women scientists
Women scientists from Tamil Nadu